Brachypnoea puncticollis, the rose leaf beetle, is a species of leaf beetle. It is found in North America.

References

Further reading

External links

Eumolpinae
Articles created by Qbugbot
Beetles described in 1824
Beetles of North America